"Warm Machine" is a song by British rock band Bush. It was released on 11 February 2000 as the second UK single from the band's third album, The Science of Things (1999).

Music video
The video was directed by Russel Thomas and Steve Jones on 18 December 1999. The live footage is taken from a show which took place at the Bayfront Amphitheratre in Miami, Florida on 18 December, while the sections of the video with the band playing on a dark stage were filmed in a London studio. The song was actually played twice at the Miami show.

Commercial performance
Although the song was not as successful as the other singles from The Science of Things, only managing to reach No. 38 on the U.S. Alternative Songs chart and No. 16 on the U.S. Hot Mainstream Rock Tracks chart, the song became the band's third most successful song in their native Britain (behind "Swallowed" and "Greedy Fly") reaching No. 45 on the UK Singles Chart.

There is evidence on SoundCloud that Warm Machine was used as a reference track for "All the Right Moves" (2009) and "Do You Feel It?" from the Chaos Chaos EP, Committed to the Crime (2014).

Track listing
UK CD 1 Single 4972752 (Cardsleeve)
"Warm Machine (Radio Version)" - 3:48
"Swallowed (Live at Molson Centre In Montreal)" - 5:06
"In a Lonely Place (Tricky Mix)" - 7:32
UK CD 2 Single 4973532 (Cardsleeve)
"Warm Machine"
"Warm Machine (Radio Version)"
"Greedy Fly (Live In Montreal)"
"The Chemicals Between Us (Original Demo Version)"

Chart performance

References

External links
 Bush Fansite
 Bush-Music.com

1999 songs
2000 singles
Bush (British band) songs
Songs written by Gavin Rossdale
Song recordings produced by Clive Langer
Song recordings produced by Alan Winstanley
Interscope Records singles
Trauma Records singles